Summit Township is the name of some places in the U.S. state of Minnesota:
Summit Township, Beltrami County, Minnesota
Summit Township, Steele County, Minnesota

See also

 Summit Lake Township, Nobles County, Minnesota
Summit Township (disambiguation)

Minnesota township disambiguation pages